This is a list of universities in Uzbekistan.

Andijan
Andijan Agriculture Institute
Andijan Machine-Building Institute
Andijan State Medical Institute
Andijan State University
Sharda University - Uzbekistan

Bukhara
Bukhara Engineering Institute of High Technology
Bukhara State Medical Institute
Bukhara State University

Jizzakh 
Jizzakh Polytechnic University
Jizzakh State Pedagogical Institute

Margilan
Margilan University

Navoi
Navoi State Mining Institute
Navoi State Pedagogical Institute

Samarkand
Institute of Archaeology of the Science Academy of Uzbekistan (in Samarkand)
Samarkand Veterinary Medicine Institute 
Samarkand State Institute of Architecture and Construction
Samarkand Institute of Economics and Service
Samarkand State Institute of Foreign Languages
Samarkand State Medical Institute
Samarkand State University
"Silk Road" International University of Tourism and Cultural Heritage

Tashkent
Ajou University in Tashkent
Pharmaceutical Technical University
TEAM University
Tashkent State Pedagogical University
Bucheon University in Tashkent
Tashkent State Institute of Oriental Studies
Sharda University, Andijan, Uzbekistan
Inha University in Tashkent
Management Development Institute of Singapore in Tashkent 
Moscow State University in Tashkent named for M. V. Lomonosov
National University of Uzbekistan
Tashkent Automobile and Road Construction Institute
Tashkent Institute of Architecture and Civil Engineering
Tashkent Institute of Finance 
 Tashkent Institute of Education
Tashkent Institute of Irrigation and Melioration
Tashkent State Agrarian University
Tashkent State Technical University
Tashkent State University of Economics
Tashkent Medical Academy
Tashkent Pediatric Medical Institute
Tashkent State Dental Institute
Tashkent Institute of Postgraduate Medical Education
Tashkent Pharmaceutical Institute
Akfa University
Tashkent State University of Law
Tashkent University of Information Technologies
University of World Economy and Diplomacy
Uzbekistan State University of World Languages
Westminster International University in Tashkent
Turin Polytechnic University in Tashkent
Webster University in Tashkent
Yeoju Technical Institute in Tashkent
Tashkent Pediatric Medical Institute Nukus branch

Urgench 

 Urgench State University
 Urgench branch of the Tashkent University of Information Technologies
 Urgench branch of Tashkent Medical Academy

References

 
Universities
Uzbekistan
Uzbekistan